Enzo Bertero (born 31 May 1996) is an Argentine professional footballer who plays as a midfielder for Sportivo Belgrano.

Career
Bertero began his career with Ben Hur, scoring two goals in twenty-five appearances in Torneo Argentino B and Torneo Federal B between 2013 and 2015. In 2017, Bertero signed for Atlético de Rafaela, with the midfielder being moved into the Primera B Nacional club's first-team squad during the 2018–19 campaign. He made his debut in August 2018 during a victory away to Lanús in the Copa Argentina. He was subsequently an unused sub for league fixtures with Quilmes and Brown, prior to making his bow in the second tier against Guillermo Brown on 7 October.

Career statistics
.

References

External links

1996 births
Living people
Footballers from Santa Fe, Argentina
Argentine footballers
Association football midfielders
Torneo Argentino B players
Primera Nacional players
Club Sportivo Ben Hur players
Atlético de Rafaela footballers
Sportivo Belgrano footballers